"Der Herr wird dich mit seiner Güte segnen" (The Lord will bless you with his goodness) is a Christian poem by Helmut Schlegel. It became a hymn of the genre Neues Geistliches Lied with a 1998 melody by Thomas Gabriel, part of the German Catholic hymnal Gotteslob.

History 
The text was written by the Franciscan Helmut Schlegel, in seven stanzas and a refrain, both of four lines. It is based on the Priestly Blessing.

The text has been set to music by Thomas Gabriel 1998, and was included in the German common Catholic hymnal Gotteslob as GL 452. With a different melody by Winfried Heurich, it is part of the Gotteslob's regional section for the Diocese of Limburg as GL 849.

References

External links 
 Simon Schade, Gabriel Dessauer: Liedporträt GL 849 / "Der Herr wird dich mit seiner Güte segnen" Diocese of Limburg
 
 

German poems
Catholic hymns in German
Contemporary Christian songs
2009 songs
Neues Geistliches Lied